Old St. Patrick's Church (also known as Old North Primary School) is a historic church at 512 N. Main Street in Wellington, Ohio.

It was built in 1875 and added to the National Register of Historic Places in 1979.

Parish website: StPatrickWellington.com

References

Churches in the Roman Catholic Diocese of Cleveland
Churches on the National Register of Historic Places in Ohio
Roman Catholic churches completed in 1875
Churches in Lorain County, Ohio
National Register of Historic Places in Lorain County, Ohio
Defunct schools in Ohio
Wellington, Ohio
19th-century Roman Catholic church buildings in the United States